Mesechthistatus taniguchii is a species of beetle in the family Cerambycidae. It was described by Seki in 1944. It is found in Japan and in Jiangxi, China.

Subspecies
 Mesechthistatus taniguchii hayashii Yokoyama, 1969
 Mesechthistatus taniguchii taniguchii (Seki, 1944)

References

Further reading

 

Phrissomini
Beetles described in 1944